The Democratic International, also known as the Jamboree in Jamba, was a 1985 meeting of anti-Communist rebels held at the headquarters of UNITA in Jamba, Angola.

The meeting was primarily funded by former Rite Aid President Lewis Lehrman and organized by anti-Communist activists Jack Abramoff and Jack Wheeler. While the Reagan administration privately supported the meeting, it did not publicize its position. The governments of Israel and South Africa supported the idea, but both respective countries were deemed inadvisable for hosting the conference.

Participants in the conference included at least four leaders of anti-communist insurgent movements: Jonas Savimbi, Adolfo Calero, Pa Kao Her, and Abdul Rahim Wardak. A number of American conservative lobbyists were also in attendance, including Jack Abramoff, Lewis Lehrman, and Jack Wheeler. Military representatives of South Africa and the US, including Lieutenant Colonel Oliver North, were present as well. 

Security at the event was handled by the South African Defence Force.

The participants released a communiqué stating:

See also
Cold War
International Freedom Foundation
Resistance International

References

Angolan Civil War
Contras
Anti-communism
Front organizations
UNITA
1985 in Angola
Nicaraguan Revolution